William J. "Billie" Harvey (February 2, 1950 – September 13, 2007) was an American racing driver from Delray Beach, Florida.

Career
Primarily an ARCA stock car racer, he won two races in the series in 1980, finishing 8th in ARCA points, and made a single CART IndyCar start at the Milwaukee Mile for owner Grant King. Harvey also made eight NASCAR Winston Cup starts from 1980 to 1983 including two Daytona 500 races. His best finish was 11th in the 1980 Coca-Cola 500.

Harvey had business interests in several marine supply companies in South Florida.

Motorsports career results

NASCAR
(key) (Bold – Pole position awarded by qualifying time. Italics – Pole position earned by points standings or practice time. * – Most laps led.)

Winston Cup Series

Daytona 500

ARCA Permatex SuperCar Series
(key) (Bold – Pole position awarded by qualifying time. Italics – Pole position earned by points standings or practice time. * – Most laps led.)

References

External links

1950 births
2007 deaths
ARCA Menards Series drivers
Champ Car drivers
NASCAR drivers
Sportspeople from Delray Beach, Florida
Racing drivers from Florida
Racing drivers from Miami